The Union of Scranton is a communion of Old Catholic churches established in 2008 by the Polish National Catholic Church (PNCC) of the United States, after the Union of Utrecht began ordaining women and blessing same-sex unions. Since then, it has expanded to include the Nordic Catholic Church (NCC), begun by people who had separated from the Church of Norway, a Lutheran state church, in opposition to similar practices and has developed a more Catholic theology. The Nordic Catholic Church includes the Christ-Catholic Church in Germany as a daughter-church, which traces its history through the Union of Utrecht and the Polish National Catholic Church, as well as St. Severin's Abbey which is the German Province of the Order of Port Royal.

Beliefs 
The beliefs shared by Union of Scranton-member churches, distinguished from Roman Catholic and Union of Utrecht churches, are described in the Declaration of Scranton. The Declaration of Scranton expands Declaration of Utrecht principles by adding theologically conservative expressions of faith in the sacraments of marriage and holy orders.

In the Declaration of Scranton, the signatories:
 reject the dogma of papal infallibility and the universal episcopate of the Bishop of Rome
 reject the dogmatic pronouncements of the Immaculate Conception and the Assumption of Mary, although not the dogmas themselves
 reject ordination of women to the priesthood, consecration of women to the episcopate and the blessing of same-sex unions
 affirm a sacrificial understanding of the Eucharist, not as a continual repetition nor a renewal of Jesus' sacrifice, but as a perpetual commemoration of the sacrifice.

Members
Polish National Catholic Church
Polish National Catholic Church Deanery in Italy
Polish Catholic Church in Republic of Poland
Nordic Catholic Church
Nordic Catholic Church in Scandinavia
Nordic Catholic Church in Germany, Hungary and Switzerland
Nordic Catholic Church in France 
Nordic Catholic Church in United Kingdom
Nordic Catholic Church in Italy
Order of Port Royal (OPR) in Germany and Sweden

Relationships
The Union of Scranton has been in dialogue with the Free Church of England .

References

External links 

Polish National Catholic Church
History of Christianity in the United States
Christian denominations established in the 21st century
History of Christianity in Norway
Old Catholicism in Germany
Christian organizations established in 2008
Old Catholic denominations